Mann Mayal is a Pakistani romantic drama television series that aired on Hum TV on 25 January 2016 to 5 September 2016, and was digitally released on the Amazon Prime and Iflix. It is co-produced by Momina Duraid of MD Productions and Samina Humayun Saeed of Next Level Entertainment, written by Samira Fazal and directed by Haseeb Hassan. Mann Mayal starred Hamza Ali Abbasi as Salahhudin and Maya Ali as Manahil in leading roles.

The series chronicles the lives of Manahil and Salahuddin. They fall in love with each other but cannot meet due to the differences in their social class.

Mann Mayal was 2016's highest rated drama serial in Pakistan.

Premise
Manahil (Maya Ali) lives in a joint family in Sukkur. Her neighbour, Salahuddin (Hamza Ali Abbasi) is an ambitious and intelligent man. Manahil's father asks Salahuddin to tutor Manahil seeing her low grades in college. Manahil and Salahuddin fall in love with each. Still, Salahuddin doesn't marry Manahil due to differences in their social-class status and fear of rejection from her family. Manahil's parents accept Mikaeel's (Gohar Rasheed) wedding proposal, who, unbeknownst to Manahil's family, is a spoiled alcoholic and gambler. Salahuddin says goodbye to Manahil for the last time before her marriage, only to end up in an allegation that he attempted to run away with her. Salahuddin clears the misunderstanding and leaves for Karachi to work at his friend Ifti's (Vasay Chaudhry) firm. In Karachi, he meets Ifti's sick father, Rehman (Talat Hussain). Rehman is treated poorly by Ifti's wife, Cookie (Arjumand Rahim), and the housekeeper Jameel (Saleem Mairaj). Salahuddin and Rehman develop a close bond and confide in each other.

Salahuddin starts to take care of Rehman while Manahil marries Mikaeel, who proves to be an abusive husband and gambling addict. Tensions rise between Salahuddin and Ifti when Cookie accuses Salahuddin of conspiring against her to gain Rehman's favour with an eye on the latter's wealth. After a heated confrontation with Ifti and Cookie, Salahuddin decides to leave their house. When Salahuddin finds out Rehman is terminally ill, he begs Ifti to let him stay. Salahuddin agrees to Cookie's condition that he must care for Rehman instead of Jameel. Eventually, Ifti comes to terms with the truth and repents allowing his father to be mistreated. Rehman later dies of his cancer while Salahuddin is visiting his home. Salahuddin is devastated to learn of Rehman's death on his return. Jameel asks Salahuddin for forgiveness and requests to stay with him in his service. Jameel also hands him a sealed package from Rehman, which contains the papers of a high-value plot of land left in Salahuddin's name as a gift. A year later, Salahuddin becomes a successful and wealthy businessman while Manahil becomes a baby boy's mother. Mikaeel's behaviour towards Manahil and their child worsens, and he views them as obstacles to his lifestyle. 

After three years, Salahuddin hires a new employee Jeena (Ayesha Khan). Jeena secretly falls in love with him and starts to place herself into his life by preparing meals for him and arranging his clothes despite being discouraged by Salahuddin. Manahil gives birth to her second child (a daughter). All this while, Salahuddin has been secretly keeping tabs on Manahil's life via Jameel, now his employee, friend, and trusted confidante. Mikaeel's gambling addiction continues to worsen. After his parents' death, he severs ties with Manahil and his children and abandons them. Manahil and Salahuddin come face to face. Salahuddin is devastated to see a ruined and broken Manahil. He realizes how his mistakes have led to her suffering. His care and concern for Manahil make her the target of Jeena's jealousy and insecurities. Salahuddin feels helpless as he tries to repair the harm he has done, realizing that the passage of time has left indelible scars on Manahil's soul.

Cast

Main cast
 Hamza Ali Abbasi as Salahuddin Shahid
 Maya Ali as Manahil "Mannu" Javed
 Gohar Rasheed as Mikaeel Shahaab
 Ayesha Khan as Jeena 'yateem'

Recurring cast
 Saba Hameed as - Manahil's mother
 Naeem Tahir as Javed; Manahil's father
 Saleem Mairaj as Jameel; Salahuddin's assistant 
 Lubna Aslam as Saliha; Manahil's aunt
 Hajra Khan as Minahil's aunt, Javed's sister
 Aiman Khan as Raabiya/Biya; Salahuddin's sister and Mannu's best friend
 Shehryar Zaidi as Shahid; Salahuddin's father
 Ismat Zaidi as Durdana; Salahuddin's and Rabiya "Biya" mother
 Mehmood Aslam as Shahaab; Mikaeel's father (died in an accident)
 Laila Zuberi as Rahila; Mikaeel's mother(died in an accident)
 Ayesha Khan as Mikaeel's grandmother
 Vasay Chaudhry as Ifti
 Arjumand Rahim as Cookie
 Talat Hussain as Rehman; Ifti's father
 Faizan Haque as Mikaeel's friend
 Haris Waheed as Mikaeel's gambling partner
 Haseeb Hassan as Receptionist (Guest appearance)
 Minal Khan as Cookie's friend

Episodes

Background and production

Development

Man Mayal was originally conceived by Hum TV's senior producer Momina Duraid and fashion-stylist Sana Shahnawaz as Tera Ghum Aur Hum in late July 2015, with Duraid's hiring Haseeb Hassan for direction, who was the director of channel's then running serial Diyar-e-Dil that ended in October 2015. Haseeb returns to direct third year in a row since his first project for channel in 2013. The screenplay for the serial is written by Lux Style Award-winning writer Samira Fazal who, previously wrote the screenplays of channel's critically acclaimed serials such as Dastaan, Bari Aapa, Mera Naseeb and most recently Alvida, it also marked the writer's first collaboration with Hassan.

In August 2015, Samina Humayun Saeed and Tariq Shah came on board as a co-producers, both Samina and Tariq previously produced cult followed-drama serial Sadqay Tumhare that aired between 2014 and 2015 television season. while Sana marked her production debut with this serial, she explained, "I'm thrilled to get a chance to work with such an amazing team so early on in my career. I couldn’t have found a better project than Mann Mayal to kick-start this new phase in my creative journey. It’s always a blast working with a team who are not only talented artists but also very dear friends. I’m confident the audiences are going to love this serial."

Writer Khalil-ur-Rehman Qamar initially wrote the lyrics for series soundtrack and helped producer Sana coined then series name Tera Ghum Aur Hum. Filmmaker Mahesh Bhatt sends regards to Shahnawaz for her production venture. Series music and background score is composed by Hamza Jafri of MAD music, while title track composition and lyrics is written by Shuja Haider and Momina hired Qurat-ul-Ain Balouch to perform the song making her second collaboration with Duraid since 2011, for drama series Humsafar.

Casting

Creative head and producers Momina Duraid, Sana Shahnawaz and writer Sameera Fazal mutually choose the cast, which includes Maya Ali, Hamza Ali Abbasi to play the leading roles of Manahil, Salah-ul-Din and Gohar Rasheed, Ayesha Khan Meekail and Jeena played negative roles. None of the leading actors have appeared together on television except Hamza and Ayesha who worked together in a 2013 film Waar and Jawani Phir Nahi Ani, and Maya Ali, Ismat Zaidi and Shehryar Zaidi who have previously worked together in Geo TV's, Meri Zindagi Hai Tu. Saba Hameed and Hamza Ali Abbasi have previously worked together in ARY Digital's Pyaray Afzal. Speaking about her character Khan said, "my role is the surprise element in the drama. She is the game changer of the play. I opted for this role because she is not a typical damsel in distress which I think I have done umpteen times; instead she is needy for love. She gives unconditional love to others and expects the same for herself,". This is Mayal Ali second consecutive collaboration with director having previously worked in Diyar-e-Dil. Stating about her character Hamza said, "my character will create magic in this serial". Hamza who plays Afzal as his feature television debut in Piyaray Afzal in 2014, returns to play Salahuddin on the request of Sana. Hamza described his character "is close to who I am." In an interview Hamza explained that, "I have done this serial after giving a hit film because I don’t want to leave television and it is my moral commitment to myself to do one serial a year. Other than this, the story is not a typical saazishi aurto wali kahani and has room for me to come out as a better actor." Gohar who have worked with Abbasi in theater and films said about his character, "Mikail is rich and a little bit spoiled; he has his own set of insecurities which he tries to overcome in his own way."

Veteran Actors Mehmood Aslam and Laila Zuberi were cast to portray the role of Mikael's parents, this roles were initially offered to actors Javed Sheikh and Atiqa Odho. Veteran actors' Saba Hameed and Naeem Tahir were cast for the role Manahil's parents and Shehryar Zaidi and Ismat Zaidi were cast for the role of Salah-ul-Din's parents, popular soap actress Aiman Khan plays the role of Rabiya as Salah-ul-Din younger sister and Manahil friend. Series also cast Arjumand Rahim, Vasay Chaudhry and National award-winning actor Talat Hussain for the roles of Ifti, cookie and Rehman.

Filming and locations

Principal photography commenced on early June 2015 and was completed in September 2015, with a total of thirty-three episodes. Director Haseeb Hassan and production house delayed the ongoing shoot of their series Sanam which was under-production to film ‘’Mann Mayal’’. During the shoot the title of Tera Gham Or Hum was used. Shooting was extensively done in remote areas of Hyderabad, Sindh and in Clifton in Karachi, Sindh.

Several sets-locations were real including Salahuddin's home, which was a 'hundred-year' Haveli, director Hassan said, "The haveli we chose as Hamza’s house was almost 100 hundreds year old. I am glad we shot there because it has been demolished by government now,". Shooting locations were overseen by art director Zeeshan. In an interview Haseeb said, "The wonderful artwork you will notice in the drama has been done by Zeeshan. Whenever I take up any project I always have some period in mind; and this serial the props and accessories we have used would represent the old era and it has been done in a way that everything looks relatable,". Cinematographer Zeb Rao and editor Mehmood Ali return as director of photography and chief editing respectively as both previously worked with Duraid's Diyar-e-Dil that earned them critical praise and acclaim.

Music

The title song of Mann Mayal was composed by musician Shuja Haider, who also penned down the lyrics while the background score for the series is done by Mad Music. The OST was performed by Qurat-ul-Ain Balouch '"QB". with Shuja Hyder as being in the chorous. It marks the return of QB to Hum TV, since she performed the OST of Roshan Sitara in 2012 and earlier it she performed the OST of channel's blockbuster drama series Humsafars title song "Woh Humsafar Tha" in 2012.

The first half of the soundtrack was released on 23 January 2016 as after the final title was revealed as Mann Mayal and next half was released on 1 February 2016. The soundtrack was produced along with series production by Momina Duraid, Samina Humayun Saeed, Sana Shahnawaz and Tariq Shah under Duraid's production company M.D Productions.

The soundtrack was praised for its lyrics and composition and vocals, QB and co-singer Shuja Hyder received much appraisal for their singing as well as enthusiastic reviews for Hyder composing, particularly Hyder being praised for "his vocals add depth and variety to the proceedings." Popularity of "Tere Naal Mein laiyan" led an online competition where on 9 February Hum Network announced on its Facebook page to "record the soundtrack and inbox to series official page, to win a title of Voice of Art and gifts hampers." On 8 August 2016, a slower version of Tere Naal Mei Laiyaan Akhiyaan was released on Mann Mayal's Twentieth episode with Rasmia Baloch and Shuja Haider performing the OST.

Track listing

Broadcast and release

Broadcast
Mann Mayal was originally scheduled to air in late December 2015, however, due to post-production delays, Hum TV rescheduled the series for January 2016. It was initially titled Tera Ghum Aur Hum in an early press releases but then it was changed to Dil-e-Jaanam and then to Mann Mayal, with no official reason given by Hum Network management to these changes. Mann Mayal aired a weekly episode on every Monday succeeding TV series Maan which was shifted on Friday after the finale of Tumhare Siwa, starting from its premiere date, with time slot of 8:00 pm. It was announced that series will be premiered on 22 January 2016 after Tumhare Siwa but then moved to Monday with the premiere date of 25 January. The show approximately airs weekly episode for 35–40 minutes (without commercials). The series was ordered and comprised the section of 33 episodes whereas initially it was announced to air 24 episodes. It was aired on Hum Europe in UK, on Hum TV USA in USA and Hum TV Mena on UAE, with same timings and premiered date. All International broadcasting aired the series in accordance with their standard times. By July 2016 Mann Mayal was broadcast by Hum Network's new channel Hum World HD for US region and In 2022, it aired in India on channel Zee Zindagi.

Home media, digital release and streaming service
In late January 2017, Hum Network released Mann Mayal. All episodes of Mann Mayal were streamed on Hum TV's official YouTube channel since its premier, in January 2017, all its episodes were removed from YouTube. In May 2017, Mann Mayal was digitally released on the iflix app as a part of channel's contract with the app. The series was one of iflix's first Pakistani series to stream. Furthermore in 2018, the series had another digital release on the Starzplay app. In 2019, Mann Mayal was removed from the iflix app and was released on the Amazon Prime app. In late January 2020, the show was again uploaded by the Hum TV on its official channel, and was released on the ZEE5 app.

Reception

Television ratings

Mann Mayal premiered with 11 million viewers in Pakistan, while on 29 January 2016, Hum TV announced that the pilot episode had received 4.9 Television Rating Points (TRP), which was the channel's highest ratings. Second week in a row it received the highest TRPs with 5.9 and for second and third episodes. For consecutive seven weeks it was the highest-rated drama series with ratings of 6.2 TRP respectively. On 30 March 2016 Hum TV announced that the channel has gained 5.8 TRPs for series tenth episode, the next week ratings were up further with 6.7 TRP for eleventh episode, with episodes twelve, thirteen and fourteen Mann Mayal was rated with TRP of 4.4, 6.7 and 5.8. Moreover, fifteenth-episode of series achieved highest ratings of 8.1 TRP, according to the channel, it was network's highest rating for any series in 2016. Hunza Gul of Brandsynario stated that Mann Mayal, was the highest trending topic of Twitter., with next three weeks it scored TRP of 6.7 for sixteenth and eighteenth episode and 4.2 for seventeenth.

From nineteenth episode to its twenty-first, the series scored TRP of 6.3, 6.5 and 6.7, on its twenty-third and twenty-fifth episode it received 7.4 and 7.7TRP. It achieved the record breaking 9.7 TRPs on Its Twenty-sixth episode breaking all the previous records including channels 2013 series, Humsafar and Zindagi Gulzar Hai. Mann Mayal was placed on first position on a list of top 10 Pakistani shows of 2016, It scored 6.1, 6.7 and 7.1TRPs for the twenty-seventh, twenty-eighth and twenty-ninth episodes, respectively. Close to finale, on its thirtieth episode  Mann Mayal peaked at 5.5 TRPs, furthermore on its thirty-second episode it averaged 6.1 TRPs. The Last episode of Mann Mayal averaged 7.1 TRPs peaking at TRP more than 9.3 and maximising 9.8 as claimed by the channel on their Facebook page.

Viewership

From its eighth till fifteenth episode Mann Mayal averages 2.2 Million viewers according to MediaLogic’s overnight ratings. Onwards episode eighteenth, series begin receiving negative reviews from the critics, despite this it reached more than 2.9 Million views till episode 21. Till episode thirty Mann Mayal received 2.9 Million viewers  where as on its final episode it finally reached a record viewership more than 3.5 Million viewers.

Critical reception
Before the premiere of series, Mann Mayal was listed as one of the most anticipated serials of 2016. Writing for Dawn News, Sadaf Haider moderately reviewed the series saying, "Hum TV back to more family-oriented viewing. The recent fervor at Hum TV to make dramas like Sangat and Gul-e-Rana which glamourise rapists may thankfully have abated." She concluded that, "This is a well-made drama worth watching. Anyone who sees the first episode can not wait to see the next. If Mann Mayal can steer clear of obvious clichés, it has the potential to not only be a blockbuster, or a 'must watch', but something iconic. All the ingredients are there." In April issue of The Express Tribune, Mann Mayal was ranked second behind Dillagi.

However, Sheeba Khan of HIP lauded the series positively praising it script, Haseebs's direction, Shuja's background score, and acting - particularly of Hamza and Aiman Khan, she also praised for family orientation script saying, "that old, traditional feel is hard to find in dramas these days...Diyar-e-Dil was the last family drama on air so it is grateful for Mann Mayal and how it was presented!". Writing for same publication Khan heavily praised the screenplay, direction and acting for third episode particularly raising Maya Ali's character saying, "Maya Ali delivered a performance that has now pit her against the best of the best in the industry." And said, "A flawlessly written episode, with flawless acting and direction!."

In a less enthusiastic review for The Express Tribune Kanza Riaz said that, "Mann Mayal is teaching our society some horrendously wrong things." She heavily criticized the serial saying, "the director and producer chose to tell a story of a weak woman who falls in love with her neighbour/friend's brother for no apparent reason. She then employs every cheap trick in the book to attract him and convinces him to ask her parents for her hand in marriage." She further evaluate the role of women in society being "powerful" not "weak" and condemn "love marriage" concept in Pakistani culture. She praised the previous women oriented dramas such as Daam, Durr-e-Shehwar, Zindagi Gulzar Hai and Alpha Bravo Charlie. She concluded by saying "our entertainment media has become extremely commercialised and rating-oriented." Ayesha Siddique of The Nation opposes the idea of spreading "wrong message" to the people and said, "Mann Mayal is attempting to make girls more expressive and bolder," and explained that, "If a girl likes someone she should express her feelings. It is not against the dignity of a woman. It is not against anyone’s dignity at all. The taboo over a woman proposing to a man should be revisited."

The soundtrack of the series was heavily praised and has garnered more than a million views on YouTube, according to Saavn, the series ranked the top charts for three consecutive weeks of its release, and on the new official Pakistani music app Taazi, the song was among the highest-rated original soundtrack of series followed By "Yar-e-Man" of Diyar-e-Dil. In lukewarm reviews for Dawn News Sadaf haider felt that series suffers from "obvious plot holes" and stated "What doesn't make sense is that each character can see a clear path out of distress but they refuse to take it." She also said, "Despite the soaring music Hum TV uses to invoke a pavlovian response out of its audience, much of the dramatic tension required to connect emotionally with the plot is lacking." She further said, "Team Mann Mayal has managed to produce a very slick product, easily digested by the masses. While there are complaints of plot loopholes and one dimensional characters, this started off as a very popular serial and still is. So far, Mann Mayal has offered nothing new or challenging. It confirms every stereotype and comforts its audience’s prejudices, making it a winning and very commercially viable combination."

The character of Mikaeel (portrayed by Gohar Rasheed) received critical appraisal from critics, but he faces criticism and harsh reaction as Mikaeel from public, in an interview he said, "a woman came up to me and asked if I am Mikaeel from Mann Mayal, when I said yes, she responded, You are a bad person and you should leave this place before we slap you." He further said "when the drama aired, I received messages from women on my Facebook page and profile saying, ‘Thank you so much for playing your character so well, our ex-husbands used to behave exactly like that; mistreating us while we used to sit naïvely and thinking no, he is my husband, there was also the societal pressure. Now after watching Mann Mayal we realise we were only ill-treating ourselves. Thank you so much for playing this role and you’re a terrible person’." Gohar has been associated with organization that run for Down Syndrome Program causes and in a wake of this cause he auctioned all of his wardrobe from series to raise funds for this programs, he said, "I am honored to be a part of this auction and to do something for these children and I hope everyone to be a part of this auction and raise money for Karachi Down Syndrome."

Despite receiving highest-ratings, Mann Myal has been a subject of skeptical reviews and reception. In addition to critical reviews Jeenas character received wide media attention and has been a subject of controversy since beginning. Commenting on her character Ayesha Khan said, "With Mann Mayal, people hate my character Jeena but that’s the success of the character. What is frustrating though is when people can’t seem to differentiate between my onscreen persona and who I am in real life."mean I'm going to take their words to heart and change who I am over it. For me these judgments by bloggers are trash and that's exactly where they go," She further said, "social media has given a voice to every idiot – that doesn't mean I'm going to take their words to heart and change who I am over it. For me these judgments by bloggers are trash and that's exactly where they go". The supporting characters were also heavily criticised. Many veteran supporting characters of Saba Hameed, Naeem Tahir were criticised due to their irresponsible parenting towards their daughter and sudden disappearance. Role played by veteran actress Ismat Zaidi who played Durdana, Salahuddin's mother was appreciable and was a major supporting character throughout the series but was criticised in episodes 24 and 25 due to her negative role as she is famous for playing innocent roles.

Sadaf Haider of Dawn Images wrote, "Mann Mayal is an undeniable runaway commercial success, it will not have the repeat value or iconic status that Humsafar, Diyar-e-Dil, Pyarey Afzal, Dastaan, Aun Zara, or other great iconic serials have. It will go down as just another pot boiler that made a lot of money, which is shame because this serial started off with a spark of brilliance." Furthermore, it was criticized for its storyline with critics saying it "senseless", and was panned for its overrun which initially was to have only twenty-four episodes. The finale episode of series revived widespread criticism and critical reviews both from public and critics. In a brief review of series, Sadaf Haider of Dawn News wrote, "even Mannu's newfound feminism couldn't save Mann Mayals last episode," she further said, "Mann Mayal had some great production value in the first 20 episodes, the script still had some internal logic and it has always been beautifully picturised. High ratings may well have been the reason for its decline in quality, as the producers realised that this cash cow could be milked for another 10 episodes." Haider, also equipped "Mann Mayal may well be a testament to the patience of the Pakistani public, the dogged determination of watching a serial to the end once it's started but the real X factor was, of course, Hamza Ali Abbasi," and advise him that he should concentrates "on quality before his brand starts to lose its luster."

Controversies
Kanza Riaz of The Express Tribune wrote for her February 2016 blog stating that Mann Mayal is teaching our society some horrendously wrong things! Riaz discouraged the plot of Manahil and Salahuddin's love story saying that Mannu's young age love has a negative affect for Pakistan's youth, she also says that it highlights a bad influent for women. Riaz discouraged the introduction episodes saying Just three episodes in, I have to say that I, for one, am heavily disappointed. The director and producer chose to tell a story of a weak woman who falls in love with her neighbour/friend’s brother for no apparent reason. She then employs every cheap trick in the book to attract him and convinces him to ask her parents for her hand in marriage. Lastly Riaz comments on Mann Mayal's television rating The rating of Mann Mayal has gone through the roof; young women are ardently watching the show and what’s sad is that they are even impressed and inspired by it! We are showing these girls that it’s okay to lust after our smoulderingly handsome teachers.  Looking to this Director Haseeb Hassan cleared the entire controversy in his interview with HIP.

Awards and accolades

See also
 2016 in Pakistani television 
 List of programs broadcast by Hum TV

References

External links
 
 Mann Mayal at Hum TV 
 
 
 

 
Hum TV
Hum Network Limited
Hum TV original programming
Pakistani romantic drama television series
Pakistani family television dramas
Pakistani telenovelas
Television series directed by Haseeb Hassan
MD Productions
Television series by MD Productions
Samira Fazal
Television series written by Samira Fazal
Serial drama television series
Television series created by Momina Duraid
Urdu-language television shows
Television shows set in Karachi
Television series set in the 2010s
Television shows set in Pakistan
Television shows filmed in Pakistan
Television series set in Hyderabad, Sindh
2016 Pakistani television series debuts
2016 Pakistani television series endings